Namobuddha is a municipality in Kavrepalanchok District of Bagmati Province of Nepal.

It was renamed from Dapcha Kashikhanda.

References

External links
Official website

Populated places in Kavrepalanchok District
Municipalities in Bagmati Province
Nepal municipalities established in 2017